is a series of video game ports, remakes, and compilations published by Sega. It consists of Sega arcade games and home console games, typically those for the Sega Genesis and Master System. The series was launched on the Sega Saturn in 1996. Entries were published for the PlayStation 2 as Sega Ages 2500, a reference to its bargain ¥2500 price point. The series later came to the Xbox 360 and PlayStation 3 as Sega Ages Online, and finally to the Nintendo Switch as simply Sega Ages. The name Sega Ages is a palindrome, with "Ages" being "Sega" backwards — this was previously used by Sega in European marketing strategies from the late 1980s to early 1990s.

The Sega Saturn and PlayStation 2 releases usually feature a singular game alongside extras such as remakes or developer info, and sold at a low price point. Most of these releases were exclusive to Japan. Three games in the Sega Saturn series - Space Harrier, Out Run and After Burner II - were selected for Sega Ages Vol. 1, released in Europe in 1996 and in North America in 1997. Several games in the PlayStation 2 series were released in Europe and North America as part of the Sega Classics Collection compilation in 2005. The PlayStation 2 series was initially developed by 3D Ages, a collaborative effort between Sega and D3 Publisher, however Sega would soon develop the games in-house following the departure of D3 Publisher from the project.

Games

Sega Ages (Sega Saturn)
The first Sega Ages series was released in 1996 for the Sega Saturn in Japan and concluded in 1998. Although the majority of the titles in this series remained exclusive to Japan, three games from the line - Out Run, Space Harrier and After Burner II, would be compiled into the video game compilation Sega Ages Vol. 1, released in Europe in 1996 by Sega itself and in North America in 1997 by Working Designs under their Spaz imprint. Despite the title, no additional volumes would be released in these territories.

† = Released in North America and Europe as part of Sega Ages Vol. 1

Sega Ages 2500 (PlayStation 2)
The second series was released for the PlayStation in 2003 and concluding in 2008, known as the Sega Ages 2500 series - this title comes from the ¥2500 price point the game had. The series was created from Sega's interest in the success of D3 Publisher's Simple budget-title video game series, which features low-budget games at a low price point. Later in 2004, D3 Publisher would leave the project and give Sega complete control of the company.

The main focus of the series was to remake older Sega video games with 3D visuals, alongside improved sound and gameplay. Following the departure of D3 Publisher, the series would soon shift into featuring compilations of other Sega video games alongside remakes of these games. The series officially concluded in 2008 after 33 entries, although several other Sega Ages 2500 games, featuring games such as Streets of Rage and Alex Kidd, were planned for release. 3D Ages was disbanded in late 2005 and absorbed into Sega.

Due to complications with Sony Computer Entertainment America, Sega was disallowed from releasing the games individually outside Japan. Instead, nine of the games in the Sega Ages 2500 series would be compiled into the Sega Classics Collection compilation for the PlayStation 2, released in North America by Sega in 2005 and in Europe by Conspiracy Entertainment in 2006.

† = Released in North America and Europe as part of Sega Classics Collection. Alien Syndrome was removed from the European release to lower the game's rating.

Sega Ages Online / Sega Vintage Collection (Xbox 360 / PlayStation 3)
The third series was released for the Xbox 360 that was both introduced and concluded in 2012. This series consisted of releases from the Sega Vintage Collection series, originally released in North America and Europe, from 2007 to 2009, as well as re-releases of games from the Sega Ages 2500 series - the latter games were only released on the PlayStation Store for the PlayStation 3 and had the Sega Ages 2500 name stripped from the title. The games were developed by M2 as opposed to being made in-house by Sega. Ten releases were made in total, making it the shortest of the Sega Ages series.

Sega Ages (Nintendo Switch)

The fourth Sega Ages series was released for the Nintendo Switch in September 2018, available through the Nintendo eShop storefront. This series was developed by M2, with lead producer Rieko Kodama from Sega. Although Sega stated that games from the Sega Saturn and Dreamcast would be made available later on, the series concluded in Japan in August 2020 and concluded elsewhere in the following month without these, although Sega stated their intention to continue re-releasing older titles in other ways.

Reception
The first Sega Ages volume was a best-seller in the United Kingdom. Next Generation rated it three stars out of five, saying it "holds up better than the Namco Museum series, and at a mere $40, these three games should be worth giving the ol' CD a spin." GamePro gave it a negative review, saying that the three games in the collection "were never all that good to begin with. They all have their strong points, but lack those special qualities that make certain games forever great." The four reviewers of Electronic Gaming Monthly unanimously contended that the three included games were outstanding and praised their arcade-perfect recreations, though they felt the collection should have included more games and historical info, as other retro compilations of the time did. They gave it a 6.5 out of 10. Sega Saturn Magazine gave it a 91%, likewise praising the three included games and the quality of the conversions. Though they criticized that After Burner and Space Harrier were somewhat wasted since they had already received excellent ports for the Sega Mega Drive and Sega 32X, they felt the compilation was worth getting for Out Run alone.

See also
Sega Forever - similar series of releases made for iOS and Android devices.
3D Classics - similar series of releases made for the Nintendo 3DS.

Notes

References

External links
 Sega Ages Online official site (Japanese)
 Sega Ages (Nintendo Switch) official site (English)
 Sega Ages (Nintendo Switch) official site (Japanese)

1996 video games
Sega Games franchises
Sega video game compilations
Sega Saturn games
PlayStation 2 games
PlayStation 3 games
Nintendo Switch games
Video games developed in Japan
Xbox 360 games